Savadi is a village in the Ron taluk of Gadag district in the Indian state of Karnataka.

Demographics
 India census, Savadi had a population of 6,939 with 3,527 males and 3,412 females and 1,374 Households.

History
Savadi in ancient times was known as Sayyadi and Saividi . Durgasimha adapted Panchatantra from Sanskrit to Kannada in Sayyadi. Savadi or Sayyadi is also famous for the ancient Narayana and Brahmeshwara Temple.

See also
Naregal
Sudi
Gajendragad
Ron
Gadag
Karnataka

References
೩.ಸವಡಿ ಗ್ರಾಮ  ಒಗ್ಗಟ್ಟಿನಿಂದ ಕೂಡಿದೆ

Villages in Gadag district